Five-Masters (or Panj Ostād) refers to five influential masters of Persian literature, Badiozzaman Forouzanfar, Malekoshoara Bahar, Jalal Homaei, Abdolazim Gharib and Rashid Yasemi.

These five masters wrote the classic book of Grammar of Persian Language which is now known as Dastoore Zabane Panj Ostad.

Five-Masters are among the most important figures in the history of Persian language and linguistics.

See also 
 Persian literature

Linguists from Iran
Persian literature
Iranian grammarians
Grammarians of Persian